Bedrock is an unincorporated community and U.S. post office in western Montrose County, Colorado, United States.  The ZIP code of Bedrock is 81411.

History
The town of Bedrock was established in 1883. The Bedrock post office opened on November 8, 1883.  The town's general store and post office were built on solid rock, hence the name. The general store originally served the ranching community of Paradox Valley and later also served uranium miners in the 20th century.

The general store was built in 1882 and featured in the 1991 film Thelma & Louise.

Geography
Bedrock is located in the southwest margin of Paradox Valley. The Dolores River enters the Paradox Valley approximately one quarter of a mile southeast of the community. Naturita lies 20 miles to the east along Colorado State Highway 90.

References

External links
 Photo of Bedrock, CO Post Office on Panoramio
 Photo of Colorado Hwy 90 near Bedrock, CO on Panoramio

Unincorporated communities in Montrose County, Colorado
Unincorporated communities in Colorado